The Teudopseina is a clade of stem-octopods that first evolved in the Toarcian, considered the largest clade of gladius-bearing coleoids in the Mesozoic. Up to five families are known, among which the Trachyteuthidae, Trachyteuthis in particular, were the most abundant.

Description 
The Teudopseina can be united by five primary traits. These are the presence of a gladius, a reduced, spoon-shaped conus, a median field that is distinctly rounded or pointed anteriorly, weakly curved hyperbolar zones, and lateral fields shorter than the hyperbolar zones. Members of the superfamily Muensterelloidea are characterized by a spoon-shaped section of the gladius, known as the patella. This is believed to be ancestral to the condition present in modern octopuses.

Taxonomy 
The current consensus is that the Teudopseina forms a stem-group of the Octopoda. Certain taxa, such as Enchoteuthis, have sometimes been classified as either relatives of giant squids or vampire squids.

References 

Cephalopods